Mortimer Phillips Bainbridge (10 November 1808 – 15 July 1857) was an American politician.

Bainbridge was a lawyer born in Louisville, Kentucky, on 10 November 1808. He later moved to Iowa Territory, where, on 22 July 1839, he married Elizabeth Sarah Ann Graham Hooe at Fort Snelling. Bainbridge was elected to the Iowa Legislative Assembly as a Whig from Dubuque County between 1840 and 1842. He was president of the Iowa Council and held the District 10 seat. After the Whig Party dissolved, Bainbridge joined the Democratic Party. He died in King George County, Virginia, on 15 July 1857.

References

1857 deaths
1808 births
Iowa Whigs
19th-century American lawyers
Members of the Iowa Territorial Legislature
Iowa lawyers
People from Dubuque County, Iowa
Lawyers from Louisville, Kentucky
19th-century American politicians
Presidents of the Iowa Senate